#1 is an EP by Suburban Kids with Biblical Names, released in 2004 by Labrador Records. "Rent a Wreck" ended up being on their #3 album, and "Love Will" as well as "Trumpets and Violins" were bonus US/UK tracks. "Do It All or Don't Do It at All" is the only track from #1 that wasn't carried on to #3.

Track listing

References

2004 EPs
Suburban Kids with Biblical Names EPs
Labrador Records EPs